The Non-nuclear aggression agreement is a bilateral and nuclear weapons control treaty between the two South Asian states, India and Pakistan, on the reduction (or limitation) of nuclear arms and pledged not to attack or assist foreign powers to attack on each's nuclear installations and facilities.  The treaty was drafted in 1988, and signed by the Prime Minister Benazir Bhutto and her Indian counterpart, Rajiv Gandhi on 21 December 1988; it entered into force in January 1991.

The treaty barred its signatories to carry out a surprise attack (or to assist foreign power to attack) on each other's nuclear installations and facilities.  The treaty provides a confidence-building security measure environment and refrained each party from "undertaking, encouraging, or participating in,directly or indirectly, any action aimed at causing destruction or damage to any nuclear installation or facility in each country". Starting in January 1992, India and Pakistan have annually exchanged lists of their respective military and civilian nuclear-related facilities.

Historical context

In 1986–87, the massive exercise, Brasstacks was carried out by the Indian Army, raising the fears of Indian attack on Pakistan's nuclear facilities.  Since then, the Foreign ministries of both countries had been negotiating to reach an understanding towards the control of nuclear weapons.

After the 1988 general elections, Prime minister Benazir Bhutto extended the invitation of Indian Prime Minister Rajiv Gandhi.  On 21 December 1988, Indian Prime Minister Rajiv Gandhi paid a state visit to Pakistan and met with Prime Minister Benazir Bhutto in Islamabad.  Further discussion brought the negotiations to an end on 21 December 1988, in Islamabad, when Prime Minister Benazir Bhutto and Prime minister Rajiv Gandhi signed the "Non-Nuclear Attack Agreement". The treaty was ratified by the parliaments of India and Pakistan on ratified on 27 January 1991.  The first list of India and Pakistan's nuclear installations was swapped between two nations on 1 January 1992.

Notes and references

Government sources

Arms control treaties
Treaties of Pakistan
Treaties of India
Nuclear weapons governance
India–Pakistan relations
1988 in Pakistan
1991 in India
Cold War treaties
Treaties concluded in 1988
Treaties entered into force in 1991
Government of Benazir Bhutto
Rajiv Gandhi administration
India–Pakistan treaties
Nuclear technology treaties
Nuclear history of Pakistan